
Gmina Stary Targ is a rural gmina (administrative district) in Sztum County, Pomeranian Voivodeship, in northern Poland.

Villages
Gmina Stary Targ contains the villages and settlements of Brzozówka, Bukowo, Czerwony Dwór, Dąbrówka Malborska, Dziewięć Włók, Gintro, Grzymała, Igły, Jordanki, Jurkowice, Kalwa, Kątki, Klecewo, Kościelec, Krzyżanki, Łabuń, Lasy, Łoza, Malewo, Mleczewo, Nowy Targ, Olszówka, Osiewo, Pijaki, Pozolia, Ramoty, Śledziówka Mała, Śledziówka Wielka, Stary Dwór, Stary Targ, Szropy, Szropy Niziny, Szropy-Osiedle, Telkwice, Trankwice, Tropy Sztumskie, Tulice, Tulice Małe, Waplewko, Waplewo Wielkie, Waplewo-Osiedle and Zielonki.

Neighbouring gminas
Gmina Stary Targ is bordered by the gminas of Dzierzgoń, Malbork, Mikołajki Pomorskie, Stare Pole and Sztum.

References
Polish official population figures 2006

Stary Targ
Sztum County